North Anderson is a populated place in Anderson Township in Madison County Indiana

Rivers
Kilbuck Creek is the only major river in North Anderson

Popular Places
Greenbrier Community Church is a popular place in North Anderson. Also Landmark Baptist Church and Edgewater woods are popular places. Keystone woods and Old national bank are popular places.

Schools
Indiana Christian Academy is the only school in North Anderson

Major Highways
State Road 9

Major Roads
Raible Ave is a boundary road for North Anderson and Anderson for 1.4 Miles. Hartman Rd is a boundary road for North Anderson and Anderson for 2.6 miles. Madison Ave is a major road. Broadway St is a major road. Cross St is a major road.

References

Populated places in Madison County, Indiana